The Cheritrini are a small tribe of butterflies in the family Lycaenidae; they contain the imperials and allies. Their closest living relatives seem to be the Horagini; indeed, the genus Ahmetia (formerly called Cowania) was in the past often placed there.

Genera
As not all Theclinae have been assigned to tribes, the genus list is preliminary. Dapidodigma, sometimes allied with the Loxurini instead (though this seems to be in error), is the most basal living genus of Cheritrini. The others seem to form a close-knit and more apomorphic radiation.

 Ahmetia (formerly Cowania)
 Cheritra – typical imperials
 Cheritrella – truncate Imperial
 Dapidodigma
 Drupadia – posies
 Ritra
 Ticherra – blue imperial

Footnotes

References

  (2008): Tree of Life Web Project – Cheritrini. Version of 2008-APR-24. Retrieved 2009-AUG-10.
  (2009): Markku Savela's Lepidoptera and Some Other Life Forms: Theclinae. Version of 2009-FEB-05. Retrieved 2009-AUG-10.

 
Theclinae
Butterfly tribes